Cocoa butter, also called theobroma oil, is a pale-yellow, edible fat extracted from the cocoa bean. It is used to make chocolate, as well as some ointments, toiletries, and pharmaceuticals. Cocoa butter has a cocoa flavor and aroma. Its melting point is slightly below human body temperature.

Extraction and composition 

Cocoa butter is obtained from whole cocoa beans. For use in chocolate manufacture, the beans are fermented before being dried. The beans are then roasted and separated from their hulls to produce cocoa nibs. About 54–58% of the cocoa nibs is cocoa butter. The cocoa nibs are ground to form cocoa mass, which is liquid at temperatures above the melting point of cocoa butter and is known as cocoa liquor or chocolate liquor. Chocolate liquor is pressed to separate the cocoa butter from the non-fat cocoa solids. Cocoa butter is sometimes deodorized to remove strong or undesirable tastes.

Cocoa butter contains a high proportion of saturated fats as well as monounsaturated oleic acid, which typically occurs in each triglyceride. The predominant triglycerides are POS, SOS, POP, where P = palmitic, O = oleic, and S = stearic acid residues. Cocoa butter, unlike non-fat cocoa solids, contains only traces of caffeine and theobromine.

Adulterants 
Some food manufacturers substitute less expensive materials in place of cocoa butter. Several analytical methods exist for testing for diluted cocoa butter. Adulterated cocoa butter is indicated by its lighter color and its diminished fluorescence upon ultraviolet illumination. Unlike cocoa butter, adulterated fat tends to smear and have a higher non-saponifiable content.

Substitutes
Cocoa butter is becoming increasingly costly. Substitutes have been designed to use as alternatives. In the United States, 100% cocoa butter must be used for the product to be called chocolate. The EU requires that alternative fats not exceed 5% of the total fat content.

Substitutes include: coconut, palm, soybean, rapeseed, cottonseed and illipe oils; and shea butter, mango kernel fat and a mixture of mango kernel fat and palm oil, and PGPR.

Uses 
Cocoa butter is a major ingredient in practically all types of chocolates (white chocolate, milk chocolate, and dark chocolate).  This application continues to dominate consumption of cocoa butter.

Pharmaceutical companies use cocoa butter's physical properties extensively. As a nontoxic solid at room temperature that melts at body temperature, it is considered an ideal base for medicinal suppositories.

Personal care
For a fat melting around body temperature, cocoa has good stability. This quality, coupled with natural antioxidants, prevents rancidity – giving it a storage life of two to five years. The velvety texture, pleasant fragrance and emollient properties of cocoa butter have made it a popular ingredient in products for the skin, such as soaps and lotions.

Physical properties 

Cocoa butter displays polymorphism, having different crystalline forms with different melting points. Conventionally the assignment of cocoa butter crystalline forms uses the nomenclature of Wille and Lutton with forms I, II, III, IV, V and VI having melting points , respectively. The production of chocolate aims to crystallise the chocolate so that the cocoa butter is predominantly in form V, which is the most stable form that can be obtained from melted cocoa butter. (Form VI either develops in solid cocoa butter after long storage, or is obtained by crystallisation from solvents). A uniform form V crystal structure will result in smooth texture, sheen, and snap. This structure is obtained by chocolate tempering. Melting the cocoa butter in chocolate and then allowing it to solidify without tempering leads to the formation of unstable polymorphic forms of cocoa butter. This can easily happen when chocolate bars are allowed to melt in a hot room and leads to the formation of white patches on the surface of the chocolate called fat bloom or chocolate bloom.

References

Components of chocolate
Vegetable oils
Excipients
Cosmetics chemicals